Sawmill is a census-designated place (CDP) in Apache County, Arizona, United States.  Sawmill is a part of Fort Defiance Agency, which is on the Navajo Nation. The population was 748 at the 2010 census. It is named after and developed around a sawmill. A trading post has been present since 1907.

Geography
Sawmill is located at  (35.896635, -109.158709).

Demographics

As of the census of 2000, there were 612 people, 161 households, and 123 families residing in the CDP. The racial makeup of the CDP was 97.1% Native American, 2.1% White, 0.5% from other races, and 0.3% from two or more races.  1.5% of the population were Hispanic or Latino of any race.

There were 161 households, out of which 44.7% had children under the age of 18 living with them, 46.6% were married couples living together, 23.6% had a female householder with no husband present, and 23.0% were non-families. 22.4% of all households were made up of individuals, and 9.3% had someone living alone who was 65 years of age or older.  The average household size was 3.7 and the average family size was 4.5.

In the CDP, the age distribution of the population shows 40.4% under the age of 18, 9.6% from 18 to 24, 25.3% from 25 to 44, 16.8% from 45 to 64, and 7.8% who were 65 years of age or older.  The median age was 25 years. For every 100 females, there were 98.7 males.  For every 100 females age 18 and over, there were 91.1 males.

The median income for a household in the CDP was $12,875, and the median income for a family was $17,386. Males had a median income of $14,375 versus $23,409 for females. The per capita income for the CDP was $4,495.  About 47.1% of families and 53.5% of the population were below the poverty line, including 53.1% of those under age 18 and 39.3% of those age 65 or over.

Education 
Most of Sawmill is a part of Window Rock Unified School District, while a small part is in the Chinle Unified School District.

Sawmill is served by Window Rock Elementary School, Tse Ho Tso Middle School, and Window Rock High School.

References

Census-designated places in Apache County, Arizona
Populated places on the Navajo Nation